David Ross Carnie (born December 14, 1969) is an American writer, magazine editor, and skateboarder. He is the former editor-in-chief of Big Brother and current writer for numerous publications.

Writing career
Carnie writes freelance and has had articles published in Rolling Stone, Hustler, The Skateboard Mag, Snowboard Magazine, and Bizarre. Carnie also helped co-write a couple of short films with Spike Jonze (whom he met through fellow Big Brother editor Jeff Tremaine). Through his work on the Big Brother videos he was also one of the original creators of the television show Jackass and has appeared in numerous Jackass episodes. During his time at Big Brother Dave can be credited with launching the careers of numerous Jackass stars, including Johnny Knoxville, Steve-O, and Chris Pontius, and has brought fame to hundreds of skateboarding stars. 
Recently, Carnie was an editor of jackassworld.com. Dave has a cat with no tail named "Gary", that has become a recurring feature in his writings and interviews.

Skateboarding involvement
Carnie was hailed for his work on exposing the dangers of the modular skateparks that many cities across the United States were installing, and was recognized by the Austin Public Skatepark Action Committee for his work. Dave also has his own brand of skateboard decks named Whalecock Skateboarding. Dave was a secret character on the PlayStation game Grind Session. His character farted while grinding.

Filmography

Television

Films

Videos

Video games
Grind Session (2000)

References

External links

Whalecock Skateboards, Dave Carnie's company
Dave Carnie's official blog

Living people
1969 births
American skateboarders